Christopher Pielli is an American politician. A Democrat, he is a member of the Pennsylvania House of Representatives representing the 156th district since 2023. He previously served as Recorder of Deeds for Chester County, Pennsylvania.

References 

1966 births
Living people
21st-century American politicians
Democratic Party members of the Pennsylvania House of Representatives
Politicians from Chester County, Pennsylvania